Charles Frank Pendleton (September 26, 1931 – July 17, 1953) was a soldier in the United States Army during the Korean War. He posthumously received the Medal of Honor for his actions on 16–17 July 1953 during the Battle of Kumsong.

Pendleton joined the Army from Fort Worth, Texas in 1951. He is buried at Laurel Land Memorial Park in Fort Worth.

Awards and decorations

Medal of Honor

{{center|<big>Charles F. Pendleton</big>}}

 Citation:'''

The President of the United States of America, in the name of Congress, takes pride in presenting the Medal of Honor (Posthumously) to Corporal Charles F. Pendleton (ASN: 25916461), United States Army, for conspicuous gallantry and indomitable courage above and beyond the call of duty while serving with Company D, 15th Infantry Regiment, 3d Infantry Division, in action against enemy aggressor forces at Choo Gung-Dong, Korea, on 16 and 17 July 1953. After consolidating and establishing a defensive perimeter on a key terrain feature, friendly elements were attacked by a large hostile force. Corporal Pendleton delivered deadly accurate fire into the approaching troops, killing approximately 15 and disorganizing the remainder with grenades. Unable to protect the flanks because of the narrow confines of the trench, he removed the machinegun from the tripod and, exposed to enemy observation, positioned it on his knee to improve his firing vantage. Observing a hostile infantryman jumping into the position, intent on throwing a grenade at his comrades, he whirled about and killed the attacker, then inflicted such heavy casualties on the enemy force that they retreated to regroup. After reorganizing, a second wave of hostile soldiers moved forward in an attempt to overrun the position and, later, when a hostile grenade landed nearby, Corporal Pendleton quickly retrieved and hurled it back at the foe. Although he was burned by the hot shells ejecting from his weapon, and he was wounded by a grenade, he refused evacuation and continued to fire on the assaulting force. As enemy action increased in tempo, his machinegun was destroyed by a grenade but, undaunted, he grabbed a carbine and continued his heroic defense until mortally wounded by a mortar burst. Corporal Pendleton's unflinching courage, gallant self-sacrifice, and consummate devotion to duty reflect lasting glory upon himself and uphold the finest traditions of the military service.

Commendations
CPL Pendelton was awarded the following:

See also

List of Medal of Honor recipients
List of Korean War Medal of Honor recipients

Notes

References

1931 births
1953 deaths
United States Army Medal of Honor recipients
American military personnel killed in the Korean War
People from Camden, Tennessee
Korean War recipients of the Medal of Honor
United States Army soldiers
United States Army personnel of the Korean War